Ivan Dečak (born 20 October 1979) is a Croatian singer and one of the founders and lead vocalist of Croatian band Vatra.

Biography
He was born in Virovitica in 1979, where he attended music school and high school.

Together with friends in 1999 he founded the band Vatra. In late 1999 he moved to Zagreb, where he lives today. He has a daughter by his girlfriend Nina.

To date, Vatra released six studio albums and over 30 singles, made a number of video clips, as well as in Croatia and the region had over 500 live appearances. In 2015, he became a coach in the reality show of HRT, The Voice – Najljepši glas Hrvatske.

References

1979 births
Living people
21st-century Croatian male singers
Croatian rock singers
People from Virovitica
Date of birth missing (living people)